Kayi Cheung (Pinyin: Zhāng Jiā'ér; Yale: Jeung1 Ga1 Yi4, born on 18 November 1983) is a Hong Kong-Canadian model and beauty pageant titleholder who was crowned Miss Hong Kong 2007 and 1st Runner-up of the Miss Chinese International 2008. She also received the Miss Vitality Ambassador award. Cheung had said her goal is to become a successful programme host and to promote healthy living.

Cheung is best friends with Tracy Chu, Roxanne Tong, Angel Chiang and Jennifer Shum.

Early life
Cheung was born on 18 November 1983 in British Hong Kong with family roots in Chaozhou, Guangdong. She was educated at David Thompson Secondary School and graduated from University of British Columbia and Chinese University of Hong Kong. At the age of 9, her family moved to Vancouver, Canada.

Pageant career

In 2005, Cheung entered the Miss Chinese (Vancouver) Pageant but she did not make the Top 3. However, she captured the Miss Vivacious Beauty award. She hosted What's On on Fairchild Television until April 2007 when she returned to Hong Kong as an overseas contestant in the Miss Hong Kong Pageant.  Cheung was not a favourite to win, and was not considered a contender. When she was announced as the winner, the reception by the audience and the public was very controversial.

What followed was massive criticism totally unseen in Hong Kong pageant history.   The media and the public severely bashed Cheung for being one of the least beautiful Miss Hong Kong winners ever. TVB, the organiser of the pageant, claimed that the onstage performance on the final night was just part of the game and Cheung had showed very strong communication skills when meeting the judges before the final, which might prove decisive.  The public were not convinced, and insisted that Cheung's win was fixed.  The bashing continued to the point that there were informal polls among internet fans on whether there should be a re-election of Miss Hong Kong 2007.  Nevertheless, Cheung handled the pressure gracefully and remained calm and composed whenever she was asked about all the harsh comments made on her looks.

Cheung competed in Sanya, China for the Miss World 2007 pageant in December 2007. In the pageant she made history by becoming the first Miss Hong Kong to win the Beauty With A Purpose award, based on her charity work for the "Wai Yin Association", a charitable organisation set up by a group of former Miss Hong Kong winners/participants since 1982.  Cheung tied with Miss Ecuador, Valeska Saab for the award, so both advanced to the semifinals automatically.  She is the first Miss Hong Kong to make the semi-finals since Pauline Yeung in 1987.  The Miss World 2007 title went to Zhang Zilin of the People's Republic of China.

In January 2008, Cheung went on to compete in the Miss Chinese International 2008 pageant  where she was met again with the same criticism and was not expected to win despite being the host delegate representative. Again she broke all odds and became 1st runner up.  This was again criticised as being the result of TVB's "help."

Filmography

Films
72 Tenants of Prosperity (2010)
I Love Hong Kong 2013 (2013)

TV series

References

External links
Kayi Cheung's Official Blog

1983 births
Living people
Hong Kong emigrants to Canada
Hong Kong film actresses
Hong Kong female models
Hong Kong television actresses
Hong Kong television presenters
Hong Kong women television presenters
Miss Hong Kong winners
Miss World 2007 delegates
Naturalized citizens of Canada
TVB actors